The women's 5000 meter at the 2020 KNSB Dutch Single Distance Championships in Heerenveen took place at Thialf ice skating rink on Sunday 29 December 2019.

Statistics

Result

Source:

Referee: Frank Zwitser. Assistant: Suzan van den Belt  Starter: Peter van Muiswinkel 
Start: 13:10 hr. Finish: 13:52 hr.

Draw

Single Distance Championships
2020 Single Distance
World